Douglas Lucas (born Douglas Glenn Lucas, Jr. on May 12, 1984) is an American singer-songwriter, and musician from Elizabethtown, Kentucky. Four months before he was to graduate high school he told his principal that he was going to drop out if he had to cut his hair. After high school, he was preparing to start studying for a degree in philosophy but quickly changed his mind when he signed a deal with Sony/ATV Music Publishing. Lucas's best-known work is from 2005 with his band The North. His most-popular song to date is "New Fixation", which was featured on ESPN's "Baseball Tonight" in April 2006 (being viewed by some four million people).

Lucas grew up around Gospel and Country music. He credits The Beatles 'White Album' as his first introduction to Rock and Roll. "I grew up sheltered and because of that I missed out on a lot of really good music. When I heard The Beatles, I realized I'd been missing out and thus began my musical journey." Lucas formed his first band named All Access in 1998. After several member changes and signing a deal with Sony/ATV, he changed the band name to The North.

Lucas is primarily known as a singer and guitar player, but he also plays drums, piano, and in 2006 he added theremin to his list of instruments. Backed by a changing lineup of musicians, he has toured constantly since the late 1990s, performing over 450 gigs in the United States from coast to coast (with his largest single audience being some 500,000). In 2008 he toured Europe, playing shows from London, England|]], England to Hamburg, Germany. Some major venues performed throughout the years include; The Viper Room in Hollywood, California, Mercury Lounge in New York City, The Cavern Club in Liverpool, England (made world-famous by The Beatles) and The Indra Club in Hamburg, Germany (where The Beatles played first). He has also performed alongside other major artists, such as Stroke 9, Eve 6, Plumb, Spitalfield, Flick, Zao, and The Elms. Although his contributions as performer and recording artist have been central to his career, his songwriting ability is generally held as his highest accomplishment.

His career accomplishments have been recognized with Billboard, SESAC, and HITS Magazine.

ASCAP Member.

People from Elizabethtown, Kentucky
1984 births
Living people
American male singer-songwriters
Rock musicians from Kentucky
American country rock singers
American country singer-songwriters
Country musicians from Kentucky
Singer-songwriters from Kentucky
21st-century American singers
21st-century American male singers